Dylan Kwabena Mills  (born 18 September 1984), better known by his stage name Dizzee Rascal, is a British MC and rapper. A pioneer of grime music, his work has also incorporated elements of UK garage, bassline, British hip hop, and R&B.

Dizzee Rascal released his debut album Boy in da Corner in 2003. It earned him the 2003 Mercury Prize, and has since been considered a grime classic. Follow-up albums Showtime, Maths + English, and Tongue n' Cheek were critically praised and certified platinum, with Tongue n' Cheek going platinum for sales exceeding 300,000 units in the United Kingdom. He has achieved 5 UK number-one singles, "Dance wiv Me", "Bonkers", "Holiday", "Dirtee Disco" and "Shout".

Early life
Dizzee Rascal was born as Dylan Kwabena Mills on 18 September 1984 in Bow, London. His Nigerian father died when Dizzee was young, and he was raised in Bow, in a single-parent family, by his Ghanaian mother Priscilla, about whom he says, "I had issues as a kid. I was violent and disruptive. The way my mum helped was by finding me a different school every time I got kicked out, always fighting to keep me in the school system."

He attended a series of schools in east London, including Langdon Park School, and was expelled from four of them, including St Paul's Way Community School. Reportedly, it was around this time that a teacher was the first to call him "Rascal". Cagey about exactly what Rascal's youthful "madnesses" entailed, in early interviews he mentioned fighting with teachers, stealing cars, and robbing pizza delivery men. In the fifth school, he was excluded from all classes except music. He also used to attend YATI (Young Actors Theatre Islington). One of his teachers at school was the comedian Shazia Mirza, who taught him science.

He began making music on the school's computer, encouraged by his music teacher Joseph Robson, and during the summer holidays attended a music workshop organised by Tower Hamlets Summer University, of which he is now a patron. He was a childhood friend of footballer Danny Shittu, whom he described as "almost like a big brother", and at whose house he made his first mixtapes and tracks. Unusually among his friends, he read the heavy metal magazine Kerrang! and was a fan of the grunge band Nirvana.

Career

2000–2003: Early career
Around the age of 14, Dizzee Rascal became an amateur drum and bass DJ, also rapping over tracks as customary in sound system culture, and making occasional appearances on local pirate radio stations. Aged sixteen, he self-produced his first single, "I Luv U". In 2002, he jointly formed the Roll Deep Crew, a 13-piece garage collective, with former school friends. He also signed a solo deal with the record label XL.

During his early career, Rascal worked with his mentor Wiley to create the still-unreleased song "We Ain't Having It" and rapped on some Sidewinder recordings. He made some instrumentals including "Go" and "Ho" and "Streetfighter". Rascal had an ongoing feud, from late 2003, with fellow underground grime artist Crazy Titch, which began when a fight broke out between the pair during a set on a guest show on the pirate radio station Deja Vu FM. The set, which features many seminal early grime artists, was filmed, and has accumulated over a million views on YouTube and resulted in the two exchanging diss tracks.

After winning a Sidewinder Award for Best Newcomer MC in 2002, Dizzee was a judge on the Sky1 show Must Be The Music.

He also did a verse on the Roll Deep remix of "Let's Push Things Forward" on the 2002 album Weak Become Heroes and 12" single by The Streets.

2003–2004: Boy in da Corner
Dizzee's first solo album, Boy in da Corner, was released to universal critical acclaim in August 2003, entering the UK Top 40 at #40. The album would peak at #23. In the same week the album was released, whilst performing with Roll Deep Crew in Cyprus, Dizzee was stabbed six times. Many tabloids suggested that this event was connected to an apparent feud between Dizzee and garage act So Solid Crew, and his pinching Lisa Maffia's buttocks. After Dizzee was hospitalised, So Solid Crew member "Megaman" – real name Dwayne Vincent – was questioned about the incident, but was released by Cypriot police.

Following the success of single "I Luv U" and the album, the second single from Boy in da Corner was "Fix Up, Look Sharp". The single, released in August 2003, gave Dizzee his first UK Top 20 single and also became the biggest hit from his debut album. In September, Dizzee was awarded the prestigious Mercury Prize for the best album of 2003. He was the youngest person at 19 years old to do so and the second rapper, after Ms. Dynamite the previous year. The album was also chosen as the No. 1 album of the year by Planet Sound, and as one of the top 50 albums of the year by Rolling Stone. His unique style, as "words pour out at a high pitch and pace, as if syllables are the only thing that can hold back a scream", have given him a sound that hip hop heads can embrace as something new and original in the hip hop scene. Later in the year he collaborated with the Basement Jaxx on their third album, Kish Kash on the track "Lucky Star". The track was released as a single in November 2003 and gave Dizzee his third top 30 hit. The third and final single, taken from his debut album, was "Jus' a Rascal", which became his fourth top 30 success. The song was also featured in the film Kidulthood released in 2006.

"Jezebel" was not a single from the album, but was well received, gaining exposure and popularity on the underground scene. The song told the tale of a young London girl, who through years of going to parties, getting drunk, doing drugs and having sex earned herself the title Jezebel. He made his US concert debut on 7 February 2004 at Volume in Williamsburg, Brooklyn.

2004–2007: Showtime

In 2004, Dizzee Rascal won the NME Award for Innovation. His second album, Showtime, was released in September of the same year, eclipsing the peak of his debut album by entering the UK Albums Chart at #8. The first single from the album, released two weeks earlier in August 2004, was titled "Stand Up Tall"; it was written and produced by grime producer DJ Youngstar of Pulse-X. The title track was featured on the soundtrack for the first FIFA Street video game.

The second single "Dream", another top 20 hit, was released in November 2004. It sampled (and used the chorus of) Captain Sensible's song "Happy Talk", originally from the makers of Rodgers and Hammerstein musical South Pacific. The "Dream" music video consisted of a mock 1950s style children's marionette show depicting scenes corresponding to the lyrics about Dizzee's youth: street culture, crime, single teenage mothers, pirate radio and garage clubs.

Later in 2004, Dizzee Rascal was part of Band Aid 20, a group of British musicians who re-recorded "Do They Know It's Christmas?" He did not sing in the song; rather, he rapped two lines of it ("Spare a thought this yuletide for the deprived, if the table was turned would you survive?" and "You ain't gotta feel guilt just selfless, give a little help to the helpless"). Dizzee Rascal was the first person to add to the song since the original was released; this would mark the first time that Dizzee reached the number one spot in the UK Singles Chart, albeit as part of the ensemble.

In 2004, Dizzee Rascal made an international endorsement deal with urban brand Eckō Unltd. and designed his own shoe with Nike in 2005.

In March 2005, the double A-side single "Off 2 Work" / "Graftin'" was released. "Graftin'" was the third and final single from the Showtime album, whilst "Off 2 Work" was a new track that did not appear on either of his albums. The accompanying music video featured Rascal in various ordinary workplace situations (as a policeman, a fast food vendor, a businessman, etc.) and as Prime Minister, announcing his engagement to Cherie Blair. It would prove to be Dizzee's lowest charting single to date, peaking outside the Top 40 at #44.

2007–2009: Maths + English
Dizzee's third album, Maths + English, was released on 4 June 2007. He stated in an interview before the album's release that "Maths" refers to producing, in terms of beats, deals and money and "English" to writing lyrics. The first single off this album, "Sirens", was released on 21 May.

The album was one of the 12 nominees for the 2007 Mercury Prize, which ultimately went to Klaxons' album Myths of the Near Future. During the year, Dizzee worked with cross-genre artist Beck on a remix of the song "Hell Yes", and provided guest vocals on an Arctic Monkeys track, the B-Side to their single "Brianstorm" named "Temptation Greets You Like Your Naughty Friend". Dizzee's version of the same song was featured as "Temptation" on his third album.

The official US album was released on 29 April 2008; it contained two tracks not on the European release, but it did not include the track "Pussyole'". It was Dizzee's first album to be released under the Definitive Jux label.

In 2008, Rascal recorded a song for suicide charity CALM; the song "Dean" was about a friend of Dizzee's who took his own life. In December of that year, he was arrested following an alleged incident involving a baseball bat in southeast London. He was released on bail to return to a police station later in December.

2009–2012: Tongue n' Cheek

Dizzee Rascal released his fourth studio album, Tongue n' Cheek, on 21 September 2009. It included his four number-one hits "Dance wiv Me", "Bonkers (with Armand Van Helden), "Holiday" and "Dirtee Disco". Its release was announced on Friday Night with Jonathan Ross, where Dizzee Rascal revealed some details about the album, including track information and production. In a collaboration track with Chase & Status titled "Heavy", Dizzee Rascal said, "Grime had a little time without me still no grime without me, No life without me, no Risky Roadz, no Grime Daily" seemingly seeking to create the impression that grime had petered out since he left the scene. On 23 May 2008, Calvin Harris, whom he collaborated with on the number-one hit "Dance Wiv Me", revealed on his Twitter that he was producing a Dizzee track; at the Evolution Festival, Newcastle, and when on tour supporting The Prodigy, he confirmed that two new singles called "Road Rage" and "Dirtee Cash", both of which featured on the album, would be released. "Dirtee Cash" peaked at No. 10 and Road Rage was never released as a single.

At the 30th annual Brit Awards, Dizzee Rascal won the award for Best British Male. He later performed a mash-up entitled "You Got the Dirtee Love" with Florence and the Machine. This collaboration was released as a charity single the following day and peaked at number 2 in the UK charts.

On 31 May 2010 Dizzee re-released the album Tongue n' Cheek with a few new tracks including "Dirtee Disco", which was released on 24 May 2010. The track went to number 1 on the UK Singles Chart.

In August 2010, it was revealed that he was to collaborate with Colombian popstar Shakira on the English version of "Loca", the lead single of her album Sale el Sol. He stated that "I know it sounds a bit mad now, but you'll see it and see what's going on, it's me doing something different man, on a merengue tip". On the week of 14 October 2010, Dizzee made his first appearance on the US Billboard Hot 100 after the song peaked number 32.

On 6 February 2011, it was announced Dizzee would support the Red Hot Chili Peppers at their Knebworth House show in the summer.

2012–2017: DirteeTV.com and The Fifth
On New Year's Day 2011, Dizzee Rascal released DirteeTV.com alongside the Newham Generals, D Double E and Footsie. The 25-track mixtape was released as a free download, and included features from fellow rappers JME, Kano, Scrufizzer, Example, Rapid, Chronik, Hyper and Smurfie Syco. The mixtape featured new and old tracks by Dizzee Rascal.

In 2012 he was also expected to have a collaboration with Snoop Dogg on either his new album or Snoop Dogg's new album Reincarnated. His first collaboration with DJ Fresh, "The Power" was the third single from Fresh's third studio album, released in September 2012. Dizzee performed during the opening ceremony of the 2012 London Olympics.

On Calvin Harris's third studio album, 18 Months, Dizzee Rascal paired up with Harris and Dillon Francis to create the track "Here 2 China". Dizzee Rascal's album The Fifth was released in 2013. The lead single was "Goin' Crazy" featuring Robbie Williams.

2016–present: Raskit and E3 AF

In June 2016, Dizzee Rascal collaborated with Calvin Harris for the third time on the single "Hype", which reached number 34 on the UK charts. A year later, he released the single "Space" with a livestreamed teaser trailer and announced his sixth studio album, titled Raskit, which was released on 21 July 2017, peaking at number 10 on the UK albums chart. Later that year, he collaborated with French rapper Orelsan on the song "Zone" (also featuring Nekfeu).

Dizzee Rascal released an EP titled Don't Gas Me in September 2018. The EP also marked the first time Dizzee and Skepta worked on a track together, releasing Money Right which peaked at number 68 on the UK singles chart. He also began appearing in Ladbrokes adverts on television, with "Bonkers" playing in the background.

In August 2020 Dizzee Rascal announced his seventh studio album, titled E3 AF, which was then released on 30 October 2020. The album peaked at number 13 on the UK albums chart.

Music and style
When starting to make music in his teenage years, Dizzee Rascal "learned to rap fast" over drum and bass tracks with 170-180 bpm, in contrast to the slower tempos of UK Garage. He also recalls being influenced by crunk (Three 6 Mafia, Lil Jon), grunge music, Black Sabbath and by Timbaland's work around that time.

Dizzee Rascal once told author Ben Thompson in an interview with The Observer magazine that "everything I do is for the music – I want to master it like Bruce Lee mastered martial arts".

Dizzee Rascal worked closely with his mentor Wiley, who created one of the first grime tracks, called "Eskimo". In 2005, music critic Sasha Frere-Jones observed that despite Dizzee's large mainstream exposure, grime still was not having a commercial breakthrough in the US, although it was "becoming familiar". His DJ, DJ Semtex, said in 2004, "the biggest conflict I have is with major labels because they still don't get it". Andy Bennett and Jon Stratton highlight in the book Britpop and the English Music Tradition (2010) how Dizzee Rascal alongside Sway and M.I.A. created music that explored new soundscapes with new technologies, with lyrics expressing anger at Britain's "racialized" subordination of minority groups and that the innovation that generates new musical forms like grime and dubstep that are, inevitably, politically engaged. The chart success of grime-influenced artists like him is heralded as a signal in the way that white Britons are adapting to a new multicultural and plural musical mix in contrast to previous bands.

Other interests

Dirtee Stank
The first white label release of "I Luv U" was made on Rascal's own label, Dirtee Stank, released when he was 16, although both of his albums and their subsequent singles have been released under XL Recordings. It was not until 30 September 2005, that Dizzee Rascal 'revived' the label and made his first signings, Klass A and Newham Generals. 

The label was formed and is owned by Dizzee Rascal, and is co-run by Dizzee's manager, Cage, label manager, Laurence Ezra, tour manager Paddy Stewart and executive producer Teriy Keys. According to Cage, Dirtee Stank exists to promote gifted artists with "social problems" that might scare off other labels. "People who, through the conditions they live in, might not be stable." 

The single "Dance Wiv Me", featuring Calvin Harris and Chrome, was released through the label on 7 July 2008; the track became Jo Whiley's Pet Sound for the Week beginning 2 June 2008, thus gaining a large amount of radio airtime. The single charted at Number 1 on download sales alone, a week before its physical release. Dizzee's next two singles, "Bonkers" and "Holiday", were also released under the record label, and these two again charted at Number 1. Dizzee then released his 4th album on the label (Tongue N' Cheek) which along with three number ones spawned the top 10 hit Dirtee Cash.

As of August 2011, the Newham Generals (D Double E & Footsie), Smurfie Syco and Pepper are signed to the label. In 2014, Merky ACE was added to the Dirtee Stank line up.

Politics
During the 2008 US presidential elections, Dizzee gave a live interview to Newsnight presenter Jeremy Paxman, in which he described Barack Obama as "an immediate symbol of unity". Addressed by Paxman as "Mr Rascal" at one point, he said he felt that hip-hop played an important part in encouraging young voters and humorously suggested that he could well one day become Prime Minister.

Personal life
In March 2005, Dizzee Rascal was arrested for allegedly carrying a section five firearm after a search during a car stop in east London; he was found to be in possession of pepper spray. The driver of the car was also arrested after being found in possession of pepper spray, an ASP baton and cannabis.

In February 2008, Dizzee Rascal's ex-girlfriend, model Kaya Bousquet, whom he had dated for two years, died in a high-speed crash on the M1 motorway. Later that year in December he was arrested and held on suspicion of possessing an offensive weapon after allegedly approaching a motorist with a baseball bat in a road rage incident at Sevenoaks Way, Orpington.

Dizzee Rascal said in 2010 that he planned not to use drugs or alcohol at all in the future. He told The Independent, "I'm not having any alcohol. No weed. I'm not doing anything – except some boxing to release energy." In 2011, however, when asked what his favourite drink was during an interview with GQ, he answered "Do I drink [alcohol] now? To be honest with you, the whole living clean vibe didn't last long. My biggest mistake was probably saying it in an interview, to be fair. I tried living mad clean – but I like partying as much as anyone else."

In November 2013, Rascal received an honorary Doctorate of the Arts from the University of East London.
He was appointed Member of the Order of the British Empire (MBE) in the 2020 Birthday Honours for services to music.

On 7 March 2022, Dizzee Rascal was convicted of assaulting his former partner Cassandra Jones at a home in Streatham on 8 June 2021, after a 'chaotic argument'. Upon leaving court, he knocked a camera from a Press Association photographer's hands and threw it across the street.

Discography

 Boy in da Corner (2003)
 Showtime (2004)
 Maths + English (2007)
 Tongue n' Cheek (2009)
 The Fifth (2013)
 Raskit (2017)
 E3 AF (2020)

Awards and nominations

References

Bibliography
Sounds Like London: 100 Years of Black Music in the Capital, 2013. (Contributor)

External links

Dizzee Rascal News at the XL Recordings home page

1984 births
Living people
Black British male rappers
Brit Award winners
English hip hop musicians
English male rappers
English people convicted of assault
English people of Ghanaian descent
English people of Nigerian descent
English record producers
Grime music artists
Members of the Order of the British Empire
NME Awards winners
People from Bow, London
Rappers from London
Stabbing survivors
UK garage musicians
XL Recordings artists
BT Digital Music Awards winners